The Small Watershed Program is a program created under the Watershed Protection and Flood Prevention Act (P.L. 83–566), and 1 of 3 programs that are combined into the Watershed and Flood Prevention Operations Program. Currently, there are 515 active projects in this program.

References

External links
 .

United States federal environmental legislation